Dieter Rödding (24 August 1937 in Hattingen (Ruhr) – 4 June 1984 in Münster) was a German mathematician who main research interest was mathematical logic.

Dieter Rödding was born on 24 August 1937 in Hattingen, Ruhr, Germany. In 1956, Rödding began his studies at the Westphalian Wilhelms-University in Münster, Germany. In 1961, he received his doctorate with the dissertation "Representative sentences about (in the Kalmár-Czillagian sense) elementary functions", supervised by Gisbert Hasenjaeger. In 1964, he completed his habilitation at Münster with the thesis "Theory of recursivity over the domain of finite sets of finite rank". In 1966, he succeeded Hans Hermes as the Chair and Director of the Institute of Mathematical Logic and Fundamental Research at the Westphalian Wilhelms-University, founded by Heinrich Scholz in 1936.

Rödding became known through his results on the classification of recursive functions, on recursive types of classical predicate logic, on Scholz's spectrum problem, as well as on quantifiers in predicate logic, and on the arithmetical hierarchy (aka the Kleene-Mostowski hierarchy). Rödding was one of the first to use a machine-oriented concept of complexity for the investigation of recursive functions and logical decision problems, before the establishment of computer science as an academic field.

His students included Egon Börger, Hans Kleine Büning, Hans Georg Carstens, Elmar Cohors-Fresenborg, Heinz-Dieter Ebbinghaus, Thomas Ottmann, Lutz Priese, and Helmut Schwichtenberg.

A complete list of Rödding's publications can be found in an obituary written by his student Egon Börger.

References

External links
 Literature by and about Dieter Rödding in the catalogue of the German National Library
 
 Photo with Heinrich Behnke (1967)

1937 births
1984 deaths
People from Hattingen
20th-century German mathematicians
University of Münster alumni
Academic staff of the University of Münster
German logicians
Mathematical logicians
Model theorists